Alfredo Vergara Morales (13 April 1915 – 18 April 1987), best known by the stage name Eduardo Alcaraz, was a Chilean-Mexican actor. Born in Santiago, he was based in Mexico since 1951. He appeared in films such as Escuela de rateros (1958) alongside Pedro Infante. He also worked as voice actor in many movies and cartoons.

In 1949, while working at Radio Quito in Ecuador, he participated in an adaptation of The War of the Worlds, similar to how Orson Welles had done a decade earlier in the United States. Alcaraz was in charge of the script of this new version, which like Welles's version represented the events narrated as if it were a true transmission. When it was revealed that it was a fictional story, a crowd made their way to the El Comercio newspaper building, where the radio worked, and set it on fire. Six people died.

Selected filmography

Film

Hollywood es así (1944)
Amor perdido (1951) - Don Paco
Woman Without Tears (1951) - Señor cura
Women's Prison (1951) - Teniente
Ella y yo (1951) - Agente viajero
Los enredos de una gallega (1951) - Don León
Las locuras de Tin-Tan (1952) - Señor Landa (uncredited)
If I Were a Congressman (1952) - Doctor
Dos caras tiene el destino (1952) - Agente de policía (uncredited)
Chucho the Mended (1952) - Amante de Margot
Te sigo esperando (1952) - (uncredited)
Mi campeón (1952) - Señor Maccini (uncredited)
Carne de presidio (1952) - Señor director carcel
Now I Am Rich (1952) - Dr. Velasco
The Atomic Fireman (1952) - Sargento Policía
Sor Alegría (1952)
Tío de mi vida (1952) - Don Roque
Pompey the Conqueror (1953) - Señor Berremundo, gerente hotel (uncredited)
Forbidden Fruit (1953) - Felipe, mayordomo
The Bachelors (1953) - Gerente hotel
The Unfaithful (1953) - Aurelio (uncredited)
Quiéreme porque me muero (1953) - Doctor (uncredited)
Nunca es tarde para amar (1953) - Empresario brasileño (uncredited)
The Photographer (1953) - Coronel
Orquídeas para mi esposa (1954) - L.G. Castro (uncredited)
Camelia (1954) - (uncredited)
Casa de muñecas (1954) - Joyero (uncredited)
La ladrona (1954) - Luigi
Hijas casaderas (1954)
El gran autor (1954) - Amigo de Sergio (uncredited)
When I Leave (1954) - Sr. Dobie (uncredited)
Se solicitan modelos (1954) - Señor Silvanito
La visita que no tocó el timbre (1965) - Don Francisco Delgado
Maldita ciudad (1954) - Director cinematográfico
Un minuto de bondad (1954) - Gaspar, mayordomo
La desconocida (1954)
La rebelión de los colgados (1954) - Doctor
Las nenas del 7 (1955) - Empresario
Tu vida entre mis manos (1955) - Nicolas, cantinero
School for Tramps (1955) - Audifas
El vendedor de muñecas (1955)
To the Four Winds (1955) - Modisto
Historia de un abrigo de mink (1955) - Sr. Rosenblum
Amor de lejos (1955) - Señor juez
The Criminal Life of Archibaldo de la Cruz (1955) - Gordo Azuara (uncredited)
Drop the Curtain (1955) - Artista en teatro (uncredited)
La barranca de la muerte (1955) - (uncredited)
Las viudas del cha-cha-cha (1955)
Look What Happened to Samson (1955) - Padre de Dalila
Tres melodías de amor (1955)
Silent Fear (1956) - Dr. Rivas
Pura Vida (1956) - Febronio
La pequeña enemiga (1956) - Doctor Olivo
El medallón del crimen (El 13 de oro) (1956) - Ramiro
Viva la juventud! (1956) - Don Rodrigo
La sierra del terror (1956)
The Third Word (1956) - Administrador Roldán
The Hidden One (1956) - Señor Ariza
Bataclam Mexicano (1956) - (uncredited)
Spring in the Heart (1956) - Arturo Dávila
¡Que seas feliz! (1956) - Maestro
Una lección de amor (1956)
The Brave One (1956) - Ticket seller (uncredited)
Esposas infieles (1956)
La adúltera (1956) - Amigo de Raúl (uncredited)
Dos diablitos en apuros (1957) - Conductor tren
Las aventuras de Pito Pérez (1957) - Padre Pureco
El campeón ciclista (1957) - Don Cosme Morales
Pablo and Carolina (1957) - Guillermo, mayordomo
Cómicos de la Legua (1957) - El abandonado
Ladrón de cadáveres (1957) - Jefe policía
Vainilla, bronce y morir (Una mujer más) (1957) - Papá de Enrique
Mi desconocida esposa (1958) - Gregorio Salas
Escuela para suegras (1958) - Segismundo
Refifí entre las mujeres (1958) - Don Julián
Trip to the Moon (1958) - Presidente
Escuela de rateros (1958) - Toño
Tú y la mentira (1958)
Música en la noche (1958)
La mafia del crimen (1958)
Aladino y la lámpara maravillosa (1958) - Genio de la lámpara
Siete pecados (1959) - Armando
Los hijos ajenos (1959) - Miguel
Mis secretarias privadas (1959) - Don Luis
Yo pecador (1959) - Señor Ricaldi
The White Renegade (1960)
Chucho el Roto (1960)
El violetero (1960) - Lic. Vidales
The Phantom of the Operetta (1960) - Don Quique
Ojos tapatios (1961) - don Giuseppe
Caperucita y sus tres amigos (1961)
Matrimonios juveniles (1961) - Félix, mayordomo
Aventuras de Chucho el Roto (1961)
La captura de Chucho el Roto (1961)
El pecado de una madre (1962) - Fito, empresario
Nuestros odiosos maridos (1962)
El cara parchada (1962) - El presidente
Las recién casadas (1962) - Sr. Campos
Pilotos de la muerte (1962) - El Barbas
La entrega de Chucho el Roto (1962)
Si yo fuera millonario (1962)
Cri Cri el grillito cantor (1963) - Empresario De Carpa
Frente al destino (1964)
Napoleoncito (1964) - Presidente del banco
Canta mi corazón (1965) - Don Beto
Sangre en el Bravo (1966) - Krauss
El pícaro (1967)
Su Excelencia (1967) - Don Salustio Menchaca, embajador de Los Cocos
Dos pintores pintorescos (1967) - Profesor italiano
Por mis pistolas (1968) - Don Chuchito
Valentín de la Sierra (1968) - (uncredited)
Un nuevo modo de amar (1968)
El matrimonio es como el demonio (1969) - Antonio Ancira
Cuernos debajo de la cama (1969)
La gran aventura (1969)
Un Quijote sin mancha (1969) - Licenciado en delegación
Como perros y gatos (1969) - Don Juan
El aviso inoportuno (1969) - Doctor
Las aventuras de Juliancito (1969) - Maestro
Capulina corazón de leon (1970)
Fray Don Juan (1970)
El cuerpazo del delito (1970) - (segment "La insaciable")
La mujer de oro (1970)
El tunco Maclovio (1970) - Tadeo Moncada
Departamento de soltero (1971)
Una vez, un hombre... (1971)
En estas camas nadie duerme (1971)
Mama Dolores (1971) - Víctor
¡Cómo hay gente sinvergüenza! (1972) - Don Antonio Meopende
Los ángeles de la tarde (1972)
Quién mató al abuelo? (1972)
La Martina (1972) - Don Fernando
Peluquero de señoras (1973) - Méndez
Conserje en condominio (1974) - Lic. Rufino
La muerte de Pancho Villa (1974)
El carita (1974)
Una noche embarazosa (1977) - Sacerdote
La viuda negra (1977)
La güera Rodríguez (1978)
Xoxontla (1978) - Don Jesús Pichardo
El cuatro dedos (1978)
The Bees (1978) - Representative at the United Nations - Israel
El circo de Capulina (1978)
El año de la peste (1979) - Dr. Luis Mario Zavala
Vivir para amar (1980)
Rigo es amor (1980) - El Gallino
Ay Chihuahua no te rajes! (1980)
El testamento (1981) - Don Agustín
Mi nombre es Sergio, soy alcohólico (1981) - Dr. Armando Camarena
Zorro, The Gay Blade (1981) - Don Jose
El barrendero (1982) - Don Chafas
Los cuates de la Rosenda (1982)
Buenas, y con... movidas (1983)
El mexicano feo (1984)

Television
El otro (1960)
Marianela (1961)
Leyendas de México (1968)
La Gata (1970) - El Francés
Muchacha italiana viene a casarse (1971) - Vittorio Maglione
La señora joven (1972) - Federico Ricarte
Donde termina el camino (1978)

References

Bibliography
Monsiváis, Carlos. Pedro Infante. Las leyes del querer. Penguin Random House Grupo Editorial México, 2012.

External links

1915 births
1987 deaths
20th-century Chilean male actors
20th-century Mexican male actors
Chilean emigrants to Mexico
Chilean male film actors
Chilean male television actors
Male actors from Santiago
Mexican male film actors
Mexican male television actors